Clavulina cristata, commonly known as the white coral fungus or the crested coral fungus, is a white- or light-colored edible coral mushroom present in temperate areas of the Americas and Europe. It is the type species of the genus Clavulina.

The commonly used species name cristata was coined in 1790 by Danish mycologist Theodor Holmskjold (as Ramaria cristata).  However, Linnaeus described apparently the same fungus as Clavaria coralloides in Species plantarum in 1753.  Therefore, according to the International Code of Nomenclature for algae, fungi, and plants, the name Clavulina coralloides should be used in preference to Clavulina cristata, although the latter name is in more common use.

Description
The coral "arms" are sparingly branched (3–4 times), 2–4 mm wide, smooth, and sometimes wrinkled longitudinally. The tips are cristate, having small pointed projections, and will often darken with age or in dry weather. The fruit bodies have no distinctive odor, and a mild taste.

The fruit bodies may have a darker color either due to natural variation (whereby the appearance of this species may approach and be confused with C. cinerea) or because of infection by a microscopic fungus, Helminthosphaeria clavariarum.

Microscopic features
The spores are white, roughly spherical, thick-walled, non-amyloid, smooth, and have dimensions of 7–11 by 6–10 µm. Basidia are club-shaped, 60–80 by 6–8 µm, and 2-spored. Cystidia are absent. Sterigmata, the slender projections of the basidium that bear the spores, may be straight or curved, and up to 7–8 µm long. Microscopic and molecular analysis indicate that the species is related to chanterelles.

Habitat
Clavulina cristata is found growing solitary or in clusters on the ground (sometimes on rotten wood) in both coniferous and hardwood forests. It is a common mushroom, and typically fruits from late summer to winter.

Edibility
This fungus is edible, but the tough flesh and insubstantial fruit bodies make it unappetizing to some individuals. It is considered excellent by some.

Lookalikes
Some other coral fungi have macroscopic and microscopic features similar to Clavulina cristata, making identification confusing. Clavulina rugosa is unbranched or sparingly branched. Clavulina cinerea is usually darker in color. Ramaria stricta has parallel branches and grows on wood.

Chemistry
In addition to the major fatty acid components, palmitic acid, oleic acid and linoleic acid, C. cristata contains two unusual fatty acids, cis-9, cis-14-octadecadien-12-ynoic acid, and the conjugated cis-9, trans-11, trans-13, cis-15-octadecatetraenoic acid (commonly known as α-parinaric acid). C. cristata is the only fungi known to contain α-parinaric acid.

References

External links

California Fungi
Mushroom Expert

Fungi of Europe
Fungi of North America
Edible fungi
cristata